Diaphorase may refer to:

 Cytochrome b5 reductase, an enzyme
 NADH dehydrogenase, an enzyme
 NADPH dehydrogenase, an enzyme